The 2011 AMJ Campbell Shorty Jenkins Classic was an annual curling bonspiel that was held from September 15 to 18 at the Brockville Country Club in Brockville, Ontario as part of the 2011–12 World Curling Tour. The purse for the men's and women's events was CAD$40,700 and CAD$16,400, respectively.

Men

Teams

Round Robin Standings

Playoffs

Women

Teams

* Ève Bélisle was filling in for Chantal Osborne.

Round Robin Standings

Playoffs

External links
Event Home Page

2011
AMJ Campbell Shorty Jenkins Classic
AMJ Campbell Shorty Jenkins Classic